Marius Johannes Josephus van Amelsvoort (29 August 1930 – 30 May 2006) was a Dutch politician and diplomat of the defunct Catholic People's Party (KVP) party and later the Christian Democratic Appeal (CDA) party and economist.

Van Amelsvoort applied at the Tilburg Catholic Economic University in July 1949 majoring in Economics and obtaining a Bachelor of Economics degree in June 1951 before graduating with a Master of Economics degree in July 1955. Van Amelsvoort worked as a civil servant for the Diplomatic service of the Ministry of Foreign Affairs from September 1955 until April 1960 and as an Attaché at the Embassy in Washington, D.C. from February 1956 until April 1960. Van Amelsvoort worked as an accountant for the Rabobank in Eindhoven from April 1960 until August 1961 as a branch manager in Eindhoven from August 1961 until May 1973.

Van Amelsvoort was elected as a Member of the Senate after the Senate election of 1969, serving from 16 September 1969 until 10 May 1971 as a backbencher. Van Amelsvoort was selected as a Member of the European Parliament and dual served in those positions, taking office on 9 March 1970. Van Amelsvoort became a Member of the House of Representatives after Roelof Nelissen was appointed as Deputy Prime Minister and Minister of Finance in the Cabinet Biesheuvel I after the election of 1971, serving from 3 August 1971 until 7 December 1972. Van Amelsvoort returned as a Member of the House of Representatives after Tiemen Brouwer was appointed as Minister of Agriculture and Fisheries in the Cabinet Den Uyl after the election of 1972, serving from 28 May 1973 until 8 June 1977. Van Amelsvoort again returned as a Member of the House of Representatives after Jaap Boersma resigned because he was still serving as Minister of Social Affairs in the Cabinet Den Uyl and because of dualism customs in the constitutional convention of Dutch politics he couldn't serve a dual mandate, taking office on 15 September 1977 serving as a frontbencher and deputy spokesperson for Finances. Van Amelsvoort was appointed as State Secretary for Finance in the Cabinet Van Agt-Wiegel following the resignation of Ad Nooteboom, taking office on 16 April 1980. After the election of 1981 Van Amelsvoort once again returned as a Member of the House of Representatives, taking office on 10 June 1981. Following the cabinet formation of 1981 Van Amelsvoort was not giving a cabinet post in the new cabinet, the Cabinet Van Agt-Wiegel was replaced by the Cabinet Van Agt II on 11 September 1981 and he continued to serve in the House of Representatives as a frontbencher and spokesperson for Finances. After the election of 1982 Van Amelsvoort was appointed as State Secretary for the Interior in the Cabinet Lubbers I, taking office on 8 November 1982.  After the election of 1986 Van Amelsvoort again returned as a Member of the House of Representatives, taking office on 3 June 1986. Following the cabinet formation of 1986 Van Amelsvoort was not giving a cabinet post in the new cabinet, the Cabinet Lubbers I was replaced by the Cabinet Lubbers II on 14 July 1986 and he again continued to serve in the House of Representatives as a frontbencher chairing the parliamentary committee for Finances and spokesperson for Economic Affairs. After the election of 1989 Van Amelsvoort was again appointed as State Secretary for Finance in the Cabinet Lubber III, taking office on 7 November 1989. In November 1993 Van Amelsvoort announced his retirement from national politics and that he wouldn't stand for the election of 1994. The Cabinet Lubber III was replaced by the Cabinet Kok I following the cabinet formation of 1994 on 22 August 1994.

Van Amelsvoort semi-retired after spending 25 years in national politics and became active in the public sector and occupied numerous seats as a corporate director and nonprofit director on several boards of directors and supervisory boards and as an advocate and lobbyist for Pensioners' interests. Van Amelsvoort also worked as a trade association executive for the Catholic Senior Citizens association (KBO) serving as Chairman of the Executive Board from 1 February 1995 until 30 May 2003.

Van Amelsvoort was known for his abilities as a debater and policy wonk. Van Amelsvoort continued to comment on political affairs until his death from a cerebrovascular disease at the age of 75.

Biography

Early life
He studied economics at the Tilburg University in Tilburg, and worked for several years at the Dutch embassy in the United States. Then he worked a long time in the banking sector as was a Board Member of the First Chamber of the CSF in which he acted as a spokesman for financial affairs.

Politics
After a brief interlude in the European Parliament followed from 1971 to 1980 a member of the Second Chamber. In the first period he was Spokesman on Development and Foreign Affairs, and in 1973 he turned down a post as Minister of Agriculture and Fisheries. Although he retired in 1994,  from 1995 to 2003 he was President of the Union of Catholic Federal Elderly (CBE) which was in still in direct contact with his party, the CDA.

Personal
Van Amelsvoort was seriously ill from 2003, and died in May 2006 at 75 years of age.

Decorations

References

External links

Official
  Drs. M.J.J. (Marius) van Amelsvoort Parlement & Politiek
  Drs. M.J.J. van Amelsvoort (KVP) Eerste Kamer der Staten-Generaal

 

 

1930 births
2006 deaths
Catholic People's Party MEPs
Catholic People's Party politicians
Christian Democratic Appeal politicians
Commanders of the Order of Leopold II
Deaths from cerebrovascular disease
Dutch accountants
Dutch bankers
Dutch corporate directors
Dutch elder rights activists
Dutch expatriates in the United States
Dutch lobbyists
Dutch nonprofit directors
Dutch nonprofit executives
Dutch Roman Catholics
Dutch trade association executives
Grand Officers of the Order of Orange-Nassau
Knights of the Holy Sepulchre
Knights of the Order of the Netherlands Lion
Members of the House of Representatives (Netherlands)
Members of the Senate (Netherlands)
MEPs for the Netherlands 1958–1979
People from Loon op Zand
People from Veldhoven
State Secretaries for Finance of the Netherlands
State Secretaries for the Interior of the Netherlands
Tilburg University alumni
20th-century Dutch businesspeople
20th-century Dutch civil servants
20th-century Dutch diplomats
20th-century Dutch economists
20th-century Dutch politicians
21st-century Dutch businesspeople
21st-century Dutch economists